Anita Annet Among (born 23 November 1973) is a Ugandan accountant, lawyer and politician who is the incumbent Speaker of the 11th Parliament of Uganda (2022–2026). She also concurrently serves as the elected member of parliament for the Bukedea District Women Constituency, the same position she held in the 10th parliament (2016–2021). She was in FDC party before she joined the ruling NRM where she was voted as the Deputy speaker of the 10th parliament.

Background and education
Among was born in Bukedea District on 23 November 1973. She attended local schools for her elementary and secondary education. She graduated with a Bachelor of Business Administration degree, from Makerere University, in 2005. In 2008, she was awarded a Master of Business Administration degree, also by Makerere University.

In 2018, Among graduated from Kampala International University, with a Bachelor of Laws degree. At that time she was in the process of attaining qualification as a Chartered Certified Accountant.

Career before politics
From 1998 until 2006, Ms Among worked at Centenary Bank, one of the large commercial banks in the country. At the time she left in 2006, she had risen to the rank of branch manager. For the ten years prior to her election to parliament, she served as a lecturer in accounting, at Kampala International University. Anita Among tried to give Zaake 10 million shillings at his wedding but the Member of parliament threw away the money to the ground because Anita Among had earlier called Zaake to face disciplinary action over Indiscipline

Political career
For two parliamentary election cycles in 2007, when Bukedea District was created, and 2011, Among lost the District Woman Representative seat to Rose Akol of the National Resistance Movement political party.

Among, a long-time member of the opposition Forum for Democratic Change political party, ran in 2016 as an independent candidate. She won and is the incumbent MP.

In 2020, she joined the National Resistance Movement (NRM) after falling out with her party FDC and won the party primaries. In the 2021 general elections, Among was one of the few legislators who was elected unopposed to join the 11th parliament though her victory was contentious because the electoral commission blocked some of her competitors from nomination.

Among declared her bid for the deputy speakership of the 11th parliament of Uganda. 

Among was elected as the new Speaker of the parliament of Uganda on the March 25, 2022 replacing the Jacob Oulanyah, the former Speaker of the parliament of Uganda, who died in Seattle,  Washington State.

Other considerations
In the 10th Parliament, Mrs. Among served as the Vice Chairperson of the Committee on Commissions, Statutory Authorities and State Enterprises (COSASE).

Personal life 
Anita Among recently introduced her new husband Moses Magogo Hassim to her Parents in a traditional marriage ceremony. She also has a son with one of Forum For Democratic Change (FDC's) officials in western Uganda, Patrick Baguma Atenyi.

See also
 Angelline Osegge
 Anna Ebaju Adeke
 Joy Atim
Parliament of Uganda
List of members of the tenth Parliament of Uganda
Bukedea District
John Bosco Ikojo
Jacob Oulanya

References

External links
 Website of the Parliament of Uganda
Anita Annet Among on Twitter
Anita Annet Among  on Facebook

1973 births
Living people
Itesot people
Ugandan accountants

Members of the Parliament of Uganda
People from Bukedea District
Makerere University alumni
Kampala International University alumni
Women members of the Parliament of Uganda
Independent politicians in Uganda
21st-century Ugandan politicians
21st-century Ugandan women politicians
Teso people
Women legislative speakers